Petrophile clavata is a species of flowering plant in the family Proteaceae and is endemic to southwestern Western Australia. It is a shrub with curved, needle-shaped, sharply-pointed leaves and spherical heads of hairy, cream-coloured to very pale yellow flowers.

Description
The flowers are arranged on the ends of branchlets in sessile, spherical heads  in diameter, with many narrow egg-shaped, densely hairy involucral bracts at the base.

Taxonomy
Petrophile clavata was first formally described in 2002 by Michael Clyde Hislop and  Barbara Lynette Rye in the journal Nuytsia from material collected by Alex George near Calingiri in 1984. The specific epithet (clavata) means "club-shaped", referring to the hairs on the pollen presenter.

Distribution and habitat
This petrophile grows in heathland on sand and is known from near Coorow and Calingiri in the Avon Wheatbelt, Geraldton Sandplains and Jarrah Forest biogeographic regions in the southwest of Western Australia.

Conservation status
Petrophile clavata is classified as "Priority Two" by the Western Australian Government Department of Parks and Wildlife meaning that it is poorly known and from only one or a few locations.

References

clavata
Eudicots of Western Australia
Endemic flora of Western Australia
Plants described in 2002
Taxa named by Barbara Lynette Rye